Fahan railway station served Fahan in County Donegal, Ireland.

The station opened on 19 September 1864 on the Londonderry and Lough Swilly Railway line from Londonderry Graving Dock to Carndonagh. Facilities included a goods shed, cattle pens and a spur to the end of the original Fahan Pier.

In January 1881 one James Bond was appointed Station Master to replace his predecessor who had been dismissed. It is reputed SM Bond in 1885 erected a small windmill powering a dynamo to generate electricity to light the station.

It closed for passengers on 6 September 1948.

After its closure as a railway station, the building continues to in use as a restaurant and pub, named the 'Railway Tavern & Firebox Grill'.

Routes

References

Disused railway stations in County Donegal
Railway stations opened in 1864
Railway stations closed in 1948
1864 establishments in Ireland
1948 disestablishments in Ireland
Railway stations in the Republic of Ireland opened in the 19th century